The Reformed Church of Arnót is located on Petőfi Street, the main older street in the village of Arnót, approximately 7 kilometres from Miskolc, Hungary.

History 

The population of Arnót was originally Evangelist, but after new settlers appeared, this historical church was founded. Data from 2001 shows that the reformed church had 500 members.

In 1930, only 2 families were reformed, but this number had increased to 100 by 1990. At that time church services took place at the Evangelist church, where Dezső Baksy served as vicar (1962-1996). He was followed by László Csomós. 

In 1998 Csomós surveyed the congregation about the reformed church and about independence from the Evangelists. Every member supported the idea. The old school building next to the Evangelist church was purchased, and the history of the new church started. On October 28, 2001, the new church opened and the new vicar, Zoltán Szilágyi, started service. The first ceremonial service was held on December 15, 2002.

References 

 
 

Churches in Hungary